Sweatbox Dynasty is the fourth studio album by American electronic musician Tobacco, released August 19, 2016, by Ghostly International.

Reception

Year-end lists

Track listing

References 

2016 albums
Tobacco (musician) albums
Ghostly International albums